Mohammad Ghassan Maatouk (born 30 April 1977) is a Syrian professional football coach and former player who is the head coach of Bahraini club East Riffa.

He played as a defender for Al-Wahda and the Syria national team; he also had a short stint at Niki Volou in Greece.

Playing career 
A Syrian international for three years, Maatouk played for Al-Wahda throughout his career, with a one-season loan spell at Greek club Niki Volou in 2006.

Managerial career 
Maatouk was head coach of Al-Muhafaza during the 2015–16 Syrian Premier League; he submitted his resignation in August 2016. Maatouk was assistant coach of the Syria national team in 2019.

In December 2019, he was appointed technical director of Al-Wahda's youth sector. Maatouk became the first team's head coach in March 2020. He helped them win the Syrian Cup, and qualify for the 2021 AFC Cup. While in December 2020 Al-Wahda rejected Maatouk's resignation submission, they accepted his second request in February 2021.

Maatouk was part of the Syria national team's staff at the 2021 FIFA Arab Cup. On 9 February 2022, he was appointed head coach of the national team; he was the fifth Syria coach to be appointed during the 2022 FIFA World Cup qualification.

In June 2022, Maatouk became head coach of Bahraini Premier League club East Riffa.

Honours

Player 
Al-Wahda
 Syrian Premier League: 2003–04
 Syrian Cup: 2002–03
 AFC Cup runner-up: 2004

Syria
 WAFF Championship runner-up: 2004

Manager 
Al-Wahda
 Syrian Cup: 2019–20
 Syrian Super Cup: 2020

References

External links
 
 

1977 births
Living people
Sportspeople from Damascus
Syrian footballers
Association football defenders
Al-Wahda SC (Syria) players
Niki Volos F.C. players
Syrian Premier League players
Syria international footballers
Syrian football managers
Al-Muhafaza SC managers
Al-Wahda SC (Syria) managers
Syria national football team managers
East Riffa Club managers
Syrian Premier League managers
Bahraini Premier League managers
Syrian expatriate footballers
Syrian expatriate sportspeople in Greece
Syrian expatriate sportspeople in Bahrain
Expatriate footballers in Greece
Expatriate footballers in Bahrain